Milesia ferruginosa is a species of hoverfly in the family Syrphidae.

Distribution
India, Laos.

References

Insects described in 1913
Eristalinae
Diptera of Asia
Taxa named by Enrico Adelelmo Brunetti